is a Japan Air Self-Defense Force unit based at Fuchu Air Base in Fuchu, Tokyo. It is responsible for the JASDF's space domain awareness capability, integrating surveillance data from a sensor near Sanyo-Onoda in Yamaguchi Prefecture, along with data supplied by JAXA and the United States Space Force. The unit also conducts satellite navigation and satellite communications for other military units.

History
The SOS was established in May 18, 2020 in a ceremony held by the Japanese Ministry of Defense with 20 JASDF personnel. A JASDF spokesman said that the SOS will have 100 personnel in the future.

The squadron will be fully operational in 2023.

See also
 Space Delta 2
 Space Delta 8

References

Units of the Japan Air Self-Defense Force
Space units and formations